Yamada is a crater on Mercury. Its name was adopted by the International Astronomical Union (IAU) on November 4, 2015. Yamada is named for the Japanese composer and conductor Kosaku Yamada. The crater was referred to as n5 in scientific literature prior to naming.

References

Impact craters on Mercury